Events in the year 2013 in the European Union.

2013 was designated as:
 European Year of Citizens

Incumbents 
 President of the European Council –  Herman Van Rompuy
 Commission President –  José Manuel Barroso
 Council Presidency –  Ireland (Jan – Jun 2013),  Lithuania (July – Dec 2013)
 Parliament President –  Martin Schulz
 High Representative –  Catherine Ashton

Events

January
 1 January
 Ireland takes over the six-month rotating Presidency of the Council of the European Union from Cyprus. The Presidency's three main priorities are stability, jobs and growth.

July
 1 July
 Croatia joins the European Union, following ratification of the 2011 Accession Treaty by all other EU countries. This seventh enlargement of the EU, brings the total number of member countries to 28, and official languages to 24.
 Lithuania takes over the six-month rotating Presidency of the Council of the European Union from Ireland.

European Capital of Culture
The European Capital of Culture is a city designated by the European Union for a period of one calendar year, during which it organises a series of cultural events with a strong European dimension.
  Marseille, France
  Košice, Slovakia

See also
 History of the European Union
 Timeline of European Union history

References

 
Years of the 21st century in the European Union
2010s in the European Union